Marc Gicquel was the defending champion; however, he didn't take part in these championships this year.
Kristof Vliegen defeated 6–2, 6–7(6), 6–3 Andreas Beck in the final.

Seeds

Draw

Final four

Top half

Bottom half

External links
 Main Draw
 Qualifying Draw

Internationaux du Doubs - Open de Franche-Comte - Singles